Ephraim Burford (1905 – 22 July 1997) was an English historian and writer.

Burford was born in London and trained as an optician before later taking an interest in history.  He fought against Franco in the Spanish Civil War

Selected writings
 The Orrible Synne - a look at London lechery from Roman to Cromwellian Times. Calder & Boyars, London, 1973 
 Queen of the Bawds: The Story of Madame Britannica Hollandia and her House of Obsenitite, Hollands Leaguer, The Book Service, 1973 
 The Bishop's Brothels. 1993.
 Private vices - public virtues: Bawdry in London from Elizabethan times to the Regency. Robert Hale, London, 1995. (With Joy Wotton) 
 Bawdy Verse

References

External links
 Manuscripts held by the University of London
 University of Liverpool Manuscripts and brief biography

1905 births
1997 deaths
20th-century English historians
Prostitution in England
Prostitution in the United Kingdom